Mpho Koaho is a Canadian actor. He portrayed Anthony on the TNT science fiction series Falling Skies (2011–2015) and was also a series regular on the Teletoon action adventure MetaJets (2011) and the BBC America science fiction comedy Dirk Gently's Holistic Detective Agency (2016–2017).

Early life and education
Mpho Koaho was born in Toronto, Ontario, Canada to South African parents.

Career
Mpho began his acting career when Maya Angelou cast him as the lead in her 1998 Miramax film Down in the Delta. After that, he appeared in films such as The Salton Sea, Four Brothers, Get Rich or Die Tryin', and Saw III.

In 2009, Koaho was nominated to two Gemini Awards; one for his supporting role on the Canadian TV series Soul, and another for his guest role on the TV series Flashpoint. He ended up winning the former.

Mpho portrayed Anthony, a series regular on the TV series Falling Skies produced by Steven Spielberg, which began airing in June 2011.

In Dirk Gently's Holistic Detective Agency (2016–2017) he played Ken the reluctant associate of "holistic assassin" Bart Curlish (Fiona Dourif).

Filmography

References

External links
 

Male actors from Toronto
Canadian male child actors
Canadian male film actors
Canadian people of South African descent
Canadian male television actors
Canadian male voice actors
Living people
Black Canadian male actors
Year of birth missing (living people)
Best Supporting Actor in a Drama Series Canadian Screen Award winners